The Roman Catholic Diocese of Saint Catharines (erected 22 November 1958) is a suffragan of the Archdiocese of Toronto in St. Catharines, Ontario. It covers the municipalities of Niagara Region and Haldimand County.

Bishops

Ordinaries
 Thomas Joseph McCarthy (9 November 1958 Appointed - 7 July 1978 Resigned)
 Thomas Benjamin Fulton (7 July 1978 Appointed - 2 February 1994 Retired)
 John Aloysius O’Mara (2 February 1994 Appointed - 9 November 2001 Retired)
 James Matthew Wingle (9 November 2001 Appointed - 7 April 2010 Resigned)
 Gerard Paul Bergie (14 September 2010 Appointed - )

Other priests of this diocese who became bishops
 Frederick Joseph Colli, appointed Auxiliary Bishop of Ottawa, Ontario in 1994
 Richard John Grecco, appointed Auxiliary Bishop of London, Ontario in 1997
 Wayne Joseph Kirkpatrick, appointed Auxiliary Bishop of Toronto, Ontario in 2012

History
The Diocese of St. Catharines underwent considerable change and consolidation from 1982 to 1997, in terms of episcopal leadership, spiritual renewal, the first ever lay diocesan congress, and Catholic secondary schools. Bishop John A. O'Mara made the congress the primary diocesan instrument to prepare local Catholics for the Great Jubilee in the year 2000. Priests and people have also celebrated many notable anniversaries and undertaken a number of church renovations and expansions, the most impressive among them being the wholesale restoration of the cathedral.

The founding bishop of the diocese, Most Rev. Thomas J. McCarthy, died on November 15, 1986. He had been bishop for twenty years, from 1958 to 1978, during which time he guided the local church through the many reforms in liturgy and governance brought about by the implementation of Vatican II.

Schools

Since 1982 Catholic secondary education in the diocese has experienced tremendous growth in the number of students and new schools. Added to the roster of high schools were St. Paul in Niagara Falls (1982); Holy Cross in St. Catharines, 1985; Lakeshore Catholic in Port Colborne (1988); St. Michael in Niagara Falls (1989); Monsignor Clancy in Thorold (1989); Blessed Trinity in Grimsby (1994); St. Francis and Ecole secondaire Jean Vanier (Saint-Jean Brebeuf) in St. Catharines (1995). Major renovations and expansion have been carried out at Lakeshore Catholic, St. Paul, Notre Dame, Denis Morris and Holy Cross.

 Niagara Catholic District School Board
 Brant Haldimand Norfolk Catholic District School Board
 Conseil scolaire catholique MonAvenir

Restoration

The largest restoration project was the cathedral parish of St. Catherine of Alexandria. More than one million dollars was spent on the work, which included a new pipe organ, work on the foundation, and repairs to the bell tower. The diocese also renovated the former Church of the Resurrection on Merrittville Highway near Brock University for a diocesan pastoral centre. It houses the Chancery, the diocesan archives, the Marriage Tribunal, the Office of Religious Education, the diocesan newspaper and a pastoral/theological resource library.

The Present Cathedral

The first Catholic church at St. Catharines was built to meet the spiritual needs of the Irish labourers who built the first Welland Canal which was opened in 1829. It was a wood structure on the same site as the present cathedral. On November 12, 1831 Bishop Alexander Macdonell of Kingston blessed and opened this church which was the first Roman Catholic Parish church to be built in the Niagara Peninsula.
This first Catholic Church was burned down by an arsonist on August 23,1842. Fortunately the second Welland Canal was being built between 1842-45 and thus there were once again many Irish labourers in the area. There was much sickness in the work camps and Dr. Constantine Lee, then Pastor at St. Catharines, contracted one of the diseases while ministering to the workers and died in the winter of 1842-43.
Often there were delays in construction of the canal, so the Irish workers used their free time to build a new parish church. Father McDonagh laid the cornerstone on Ascension Day, May 25, 1843. The Irish Canal workers continued to build the church for the next two years — for which there is a commemorative stone in Latin, dated 1844, by the entrance to the church. Father McDonagh opened the new church, which was dedicated to St. Catherine of Alexandria on June 10, 1845. During the latter part of the nineteenth century many additions were made to the church to give it the structure it has now. In the post-Vatican II period its interior was updated somewhat to give the church the appearance that it has today.
For almost a century the church was usually the seat of the Deanery of St. Catharines, the Dean residing at its Rectory. In 1945 it celebrated the centennial of the opening of the present church. On November 25, 1958 it became the Cathedral Church of the newly formed Diocese of St. Catharines.

The Story of St. Catherine of Alexandria

Although the exact reasons why the City of St. Catharines was originally called by this name remain in doubt, many faithful throughout the diocese continue to have a strong devotion for their patron saint.
A citizen of Alexandria, Egypt, St. Catherine died around 310 AD after refusing to renounce her Christian faith, and in her trials she converted many to Christianity. She was tortured on a spiked wheel which broke miraculously when she was placed upon it (hence the broken Catherine Wheel in church symbolism). Eventually she was beheaded and her body is reputedly buried in a monastery on Mount Sinai.
St. Catherine was one of the voices that spoke to St. Joan of Arc and St. Catherine has always been a particularly popular saint among the people of France. Saint Marguerite Bourgeoys brought over from France to Quebec the tradition of special celebrations on St. Catherine's Day, November 25th of each year. In the province of Quebec, St. Catherine's Feast is still celebrated as the special day for unmarried women. She is the patroness of maidens, philosophers and preachers, and of the Cathedral and Diocese of St. Catharines.

The Crest

The first crest was designed when the new Diocese of St. Catharines was established in 1958. This crest consisted of the Bishop's mitre, and the broken Catherine Wheel superimposed upon the Welland Canal. This was replaced by a second crest in 1983, which hoped to incorporate still more of the theological, historical and geographical features of the Diocese.
The components of the new crest are: The crest is divided into left and right halves from top to bottom by the Welland Canal — portrayed in the crest by six links going from right to left, back and forth three times. The crest is divided into a top and bottom half by two wavy lines, representing the two major rivers in the St. Catharines Diocese — the Grand River to the left and the Welland river to the right. The blue background represents the sky and the rest and peace that only Heaven can give.

It symbolizes the desire of the Diocese for peace with its neighbours in the United States of America, as well as within the local Niagara Peninsula community, an area of Canada which has had more than its share of battles over the centuries.

Conclusion

In 1997, the Diocese of St. Catharines numbered about 150,000 Catholics, with about 50 parish and mission churches and served by some 100 priests. There were twenty religious communities of fathers, brothers, and sisters who ran a wide variety of educational, social, medical and charitable institutions within the Diocese. Catholic chaplains were also assigned to major religious and secular institutions.
The Catholic community has contributed to all walks of life in the Niagara Peninsula over the years. In addition to their spiritual role, first as missionaries, then as chaplains and finally as parish priests, the clergy have taken a strong hand over the years in building up the institutional and spiritual life of the area with the help of religious communities. The laity over the years have served as explorers, traders, soldiers, farmers, canal builders, railroad workers and factory labourers. In addition to their spiritual and charitable contributions the laity have added immensely to the social, intellectual and cultural life of the Peninsula community.

References

Bibliography

External links
Roman Catholic Diocese of Saint Catharines site

Saint Catharines
Christian organizations established in 1958
Roman Catholic dioceses and prelatures established in the 20th century
St. Catharines
1958 establishments in Ontario